Jarrod Witts (born 13 September 1992) is a professional Australian rules footballer playing for the Gold Coast Football Club in the Australian Football League (AFL). He previously played for the Collingwood Football Club from 2012 to 2016. Witts was appointed Gold Coast co-captain along with David Swallow from the 2019 season.

Early life
Witts was born in Sydney and grew up in the northern suburb of Normanhurst. He attended Barker College on the North Shore of Sydney. His first sporting interest was Australian rules football and he would often attend Sydney Swans home games in his youth. In 1999, Witts was in attendance at the Sydney Cricket Ground the day Tony Lockett broke Gordon Coventry's all-time goal kicking record and ran onto the field after the historic achievement.

Despite his early interest in Australian rules football, Witts switched allegiances later in childhood and took up rugby union in winter and cricket in the summer months throughout his adolescence. As a cricketer, he was selected in the New South Wales Emerging Blues squad and played alongside future Australian test captain Pat Cummins. At the age of 15, he was convinced by school friends to try Australian rules football again and joined the under-16 side at the St Ives Football Club. In just his third game for St Ives, Witts was scouted by Collingwood employee Rod Carter, who informed the Magpies' recruiting manager Derek Hine of Witts' potential. A week later, Hine offered Witts a NSW scholarship to join Collingwood and the deal was accepted.

In 2009, he joined Sydney University's under-18's team and continued his development. As a part of the NSW scholarship program, Witts played numerous games for Greater Western Sydney's TAC Cup team in 2010. The following year saw him elevated to Collingwood's senior list and his AFL journey began.

AFL career
He made his AFL debut for Collingwood against St Kilda in Round 6 of the 2013 AFL season. At the conclusion of the 2016 season, he was traded to the Gold Coast Football Club.

On January 16, he signed a contract extension until the end of the 2024 season, where he'll be an unrestricted free agent. In February 2019, Witts was named as Gold Coast co-captain, alongside David Swallow. Standing at 209cm, Witts is the tallest captain in AFL/VFL history. A record formerly held by Steven King at 202cm. At the end of the 2019 AFL season, he broke the record for the most hitouts in a home-and-away season (excluding finals) with 1008.

As of the start of the 2022 AFL season, Witts was the equal fourth tallest player in the AFL.

Statistics
Statistics are correct to the end of round 22 2022

|- style="background-color: #EAEAEA"
! scope="row" style="text-align:center" | 2012
|
| 15 || 0 || — || — || — || — || — || — || — || — || — || — || — || — || — || — || — || — || —
|-
! scope="row" style="text-align:center" | 2013
|
| 15 || 7 || 5 || 3 || 29 || 35 || 64 || 23 || 20 || 74 || 0.7 || 0.4 || 4.1 || 5.0 || 9.1 || 3.3 || 2.9 || 10.6 || 0
|- style="background-color: #EAEAEA"
! scope="row" style="text-align:center" | 2014
|
| 15 || 20 || 8 || 4 || 108 || 91 || 199 || 57 || 70 || 375 || 0.4 || 0.2 || 5.4 || 4.6 || 10.0 || 2.9 || 3.5 || 18.8 || 0
|-
! scope="row" style="text-align:center" | 2015
|
| 15 || 11 || 5 || 4 || 58 || 57 || 115 || 23 || 41 || 245 || 0.5 || 0.4 || 5.3 || 5.2 || 10.5 || 2.1 || 3.7 || 22.3 || 0
|- style="background-color: #EAEAEA"
! scope="row" style="text-align:center" | 2016
|
| 15 || 2 || 0 || 1 || 8 || 8 || 16 || 3 || 8 || 31 || 0.0 || 0.5 || 4.0 || 4.0 || 8.0 || 1.5 || 4.0 || 15.5 || 0
|- 
! scope="row" style="text-align:center" | 2017
|
| 28 || 18 || 2 || 4 || 112 || 128 || 240 || 46 || 64 || 682 || 0.1 || 0.2 || 6.2 || 7.1 || 13.3 || 2.5 || 3.5 || 37.8 || 1
|- style="background-color: #EAEAEA"
! scope="row" style="text-align:center" | 2018
|
| 28 || 22 || 2 || 6 || 156 || 144 || 300 || 46 || 86 || 854 || 0.0 || 0.2 || 7.0 || 6.5 || 13.6 || 2.0 || 3.9 || 38.8 || 2
|- 
! scope="row" style="text-align:center" | 2019
|
| 28 || 22 || 3 || 3 || 188 || 132 || 320 || 64 || 67 || 1008 || 0.1 || 0.1 || 8.5 || 6.0 || 14.5 || 2.9 || 3.0 || 45.8 || 1
|- style="background-color: #EAEAEA"
! scope="row" style="text-align:center" | 2020
|
| 28 || 17 || 0 || 3 || 98 || 72 || 170 || 37 || 28 || 476 || 0.0 || 0.1 || 5.7 || 4.2 || 10.0 || 2.1 || 1.6 || 28.0 || 2
|- 
! scope="row" style="text-align:center" | 2021
|
| 28 || 3 || 0 || 1 || 24 || 18 || 41 || 9 || 8 || 87 || 0.0 || 0.3 || 8.0 || 6.0 || 13.6 || 3.0 || 2.6 || 29.0 || 0
|- style="background-color: #EAEAEA"
! scope="row" style="text-align:center" | 2022
|
| 28 || 21 || 4 || 2 || 159 || 123 || 282 || 52 || 61 || 805 || 0.1 || 0.0 || 7.5 || 5.8 || 13.4 || 2.4 || 2.9 || 38.3 || TBA
|- class="sortbottom"
! colspan=3| Career
! 143
! 29
! 31
! 940
! 807
! 1747
! 360
! 453
! 4638
! 0.2
! 0.2
! 6.5
! 5.6
! 12.2
! 2.5
! 3.1
! 32.4
! 6
|}

Notes

References

External links

Living people
1992 births
Collingwood Football Club players
Australian rules footballers from New South Wales
Sydney University Australian National Football Club players
Gold Coast Football Club players
Gold Coast Suns Club Champion winners